The European Championships Jodo 2009 were held on 17 and 18 November 2009 in Mierlo, the Netherlands.

Organisation 
The European Championships where hosted by the Netherlands Kendo Renmei (N.K.R.), with help from the European Kendo Federation (E.K.F.) and technical assistance of the All Japan Kendo Federation (A.J.K.F.).

Participating countries 
Austria, Belgium, Finland, France, Germany, Greece, Hungary, Israel, Italy, Jordan, Netherlands, Norway,  Poland, Portugal, Russia, Sweden, Switzerland, United Kingdom.

Results

Mudan (none Dan)
Competitors: 21
Champion: Michal Szczepanžski, Poland
Vice-champion: Jesper Waldestal, Sweden
3rd place: Adam Majchrzak, Poland
3rd place: Matthew Sykes-Gelder, Switzerland
Fighting Spirit Award: Zoltan Kozar, Hungary

Shodan (1st Dan)
Competitors: 24
Champion: Alexander Egunov, Russia.
Vice-champion: Igor Chursin, Russia.
3rd place: Yvonne Lauper, Switzerland.
3rd place: Roberto Milana, Italy.
Fighting Spirit Award: Carl-Johan Henriksso, Sweden.

Nidan (2nd Dan)
Competitors: 16
Champion: Jonnathan Vandenbussche, Belgium.
Vice-champion: Liviu Vlad, Belgium.
3rd place: Felix Klein, Germany
3rd place: Daniel Behrendt, Switzerland.
Fighting Spirit Award: Luc Quaglia, France.

Sandan (3rd Dan) 
Competitors: 23
Champion: Aurelien Nacrour, United Kingdom.
Vice-champion: Lukasz Machura, Poland.
3rd place: Daniel Silk, United Kingdom.
3rd place: Sida Yin, Sweden.
Fighting Spirit Award: Konstadinos Matzaras, Greece.

Yondan (4th Dan) 
Competitors: 16
Champion: Kevin Groos, Netherlands.
Vice-champion: Robert Voelkmann, Germany.
3rd place: Katja Niklaus, Switzerland.
3rd place: Bruno Lehmann, Switzerland.
Fighting Spirit Award: Gaetano Dellisanti, Italy.

Godan (5th Dan) 
Competitors: 6
Champion: Andy Watson, United Kingdom.
Vice-champion: Hans Pegtel, Netherlands.
3rd place: Bernhard Merkel, Germany.
3rd place: Harry Jones, United Kingdom.
Fighting Spirit Award: Jean-Marc Billaudeau, France.

Teams
Countries: 17
Champion: Germany
Vice-champion: Poland
3rd place: Switzerland
3rd place: France

References

External links 
 European Championships Iaido and Jodo

Kendo
Sports competitions in North Brabant
Sport in Geldrop-Mierlo
2009 in Dutch sport